Saint Mary's GAC Slaughtmanus is a Gaelic Athletic Association club based in Slaughtmanus on the outskirts of Derry, County Londonderry, Northern Ireland. The club is a member of the Derry GAA and currently caters for Gaelic football and Camogie.

The team serves for the parish of Tamnaherin, drawing players from places such as Lettershendoney, Strathfoyle and Eglinton as well as some players from the Waterside area of Derry. Underage teams up to under-12s play in the North Derry league and championships, while teams from under-14 upwards compete in All-Derry competitions. Slaughtmanus have won the Derry Intermediate Football Championship once.

Gaelic football
Slaughtmanus fields Gaelic football teams at under-8, 10, 12, 14, 16, Minor, Reserve and Senior levels.

Club history
St Mary's GAC Slaughtmanus was founded in 1978 when two local teams, Wolf Tone Slaughtmanus, founded in 1958, and St Mary's Mullabouy, founded in 1976, amalgamated.

On 30 November 1978 Slaughtmanus secretary Edmund Brewster received a letter from the secretary of St Mary's GAC Mullabouy requesting the possibility of the two clubs amalgamating. The two clubs decided to have a public meeting on 20 December 1978. The meeting was chaired by An tAth. Seán Ó Gallchobhair (the curate in Tamnaherin end of the Parish at the time). After much discussion the two clubs decided that the best thing for the future of the GAA in the area was to amalgamate. The new club was to be called St Mary's GAC Slaughtmanus. The club colours were to be Red and Black. These colours had no significance to either club. Ó Gallchobhair was elected president of the club and remained so until he was made Parish Priest of the Parish in 1988.

The first officers of the newly formed club were: 
Chairman: Francie Connor
Vice Chairman John-Joe Logue
Secretary: Edmund Brewster
Assistant Secretary: Felix Connor
Treasurer: Geff Watson
Assistant Treasurer: Gerald McWilliams

The senior and reserve teams where managed by Christy McWilliams, Malachy Connor, P. Killen and Gerry Gormley.

The newly formed committee approached The Doire County Board to ask if the senior and reserve teams could play in The All County Division 2 as Drumsurn did not want to be promoted that year to 1st Division. The County Board agreed and St Mary's GAC Slaughtmanus played its first match against Glenullin in March 1979.

In 2000 it was decided to change the club colours to green and red, green representing the old Slaughtmanus and red representing Mullabouy.

Playing numbers have increased since Strathfoyle team Enagh became defunct. The club had a new pitch installed and pending a lottery grant plan further developments such as a training pitch and a new hall.

Ladies' Gaelic football
The club also has Ladies' football teams across various age-groups.

Honours

Senior
Derry Intermediate Football Championship: 1
1988
Derry Junior Football League: 1
2019

Reserve
Derry Intermediate Reserve Football Championship: 2
1991
2022

Under-21
 Harry O' Kane Football Championship: 1
 2007

Minor
Tommy O'Neill Cup (All County Minor 'B' Football Championship): 1
2004
North Derry Minor 'A' Football Championship: 2
2003, 2004
North Derry Minor 'A' Football League: 1
2005

Under-16
 North Derry Under-16 'B' Football League: 2
 1997, 1998, 2005,2021

Note: The above lists may be incomplete. Please add any other honours you know of.

See also
Derry Intermediate Football Championship
List of Gaelic games clubs in Derry

External links
Official Derry GAA website
Derry Club GAA

References

Gaelic games clubs in County Londonderry
Gaelic football clubs in County Londonderry